Siam Nakhon (Thai: สยามนคร) is the name of a former Thai province. It was a changwat (province) of Siam, but was ceded to French Indochina in 1907. The name of Siam Nakhon was later changed to Siem Reap in Cambodian.

The capital city of the Khmer Empire in ancient times was declining in the 17th century. In the mid-fourteenth century, the Siamese or Thai speaking people, from Chao Phraya River plain, rose to power. The new Siamese kingdom of Ayutthaya was founded and started expanding eastwards, towards Angkor.

After years of internal strife in Angkor, Angkor was slowly in decline and there was in-fighting between the Khmers for the Angkorian throne. Eventually Angkor Thom was sacked and abandoned until the nineteenth century.

Prior to the Franco-Thai Treaty of 1867, Siem Reap and Battambang provinces were ceded to Siam in 1795 by the Cambodian king, Ang Eng which in return was able to rule Cambodia without interference with Thai-backed Khmer officer, Aphaiphubet. The treaty only further verify the two provinces were part of Siam's proper in return for Siam renouncing suzerainty over the rest of Cambodia. Siem Reap city was under total Siamese control through a local Khmer family. The Siamese then called this province Siam Nakhon, (later known as Siemmarat), meaning "Siamese town."

At the beginning of the 20th century the province (along with Battambang) was in turn ceded back to Cambodia (now part of French Indochina) in the Franco-Siamese Treaty of 1907, due to the failure of 1904 version of treaty which the French accidentally annexed Thai speaking city of Trat. The French position being the former relationships of the court of Angkor to the Vietnamese (also a part of French Indochina), the history of Angkor as the capital of the Khmer empire and the French desire for the complete territorial integrity of French Indochina. For this reason, the French was able to exchange lands with Siam which the French squired the provinces of Siem Reap and Battambang while Siam gained both Trat and the district of Dan Sai. 

The province was renamed Siem Reap, which in Khmer means "Defeat of Siam", referring to the fact that the Siamese were no longer in control of the ancient Khmer capital of Angkor Thom and its temples, particularly Angkor Wat.

See also
 Phibunsongkhram Province

External links
The Land Boundaries of Indochina: Cambodia, Laos and Vietnam

Former provinces of Thailand